The Italian Challenge is a golf tournament on the Challenge Tour. It was first played in 2007.

Winners

Notes

External links
Coverage on the Challenge Tour's official site

Challenge Tour events
Golf tournaments in Italy